Lower Ashton is a village on the western slopes of Haldon in Teignbridge, Devon, England. Along with Higher Ashton it is part of the civil parish of Ashton, which in 2001 had a population of 174. Its bridge across the River Teign, known as Spara Bridge, was built in 1604.

External links 
 

Villages in Devon